Isolde is a German feminine given name derived from either the Old High German words īs ("ice") and hiltja ("battle"),  or the Brythonic adsiltia ("she who is gazed upon"). The name was further popularized in Germany and German-speaking countries following the opera Tristan und Isolde composed by Richard Wagner between 1857 and 1859, and based on the 12th-century chivalric romance Tristan and Iseult. Wagner subsequently had a daughter in 1865, who was named Isolde von Bülow. 

People bearing the name Isolde include:
Isolde Ahlgrimm (1914–1995), Austrian harpsichordist and fortepianist
Isolde Barth (born 1948), German actress
Isolde Eisele (born 1953), German rower
Isolde Frölian (1908–1957), German gymnast 
Isolde Hausser (1889–1951), German physicist
Isolde Kostner (born 1975), Italian alpine skier 
Isolde Kurz (1853–1944), German poet and short story writer
Isolde Lasoen (born 1979), Belgian musician and singer
Isolde Liebherr (born 1949), German-Swiss businessperson and entrepreneur
Isolde Menges (1893–1976), English violinist 
Isolde Ries (born 1956), German politician

References 

German feminine given names
Feminine given names